Gonalston is a small village in Nottinghamshire lying 
just to the north-east of Lowdham and almost upon the A612 trunk road that runs from Nottingham to Southwell. Population details are included in the civil parish of Epperstone.

Toponymy
Gonalston seems to contain the Old Norse personal name, Gunnolf,   + tun (Old English), an enclosure; a farmstead; a village; an estate.., so  'Gunnolf's farm/settlement'.

Historical
According to Francis White's Directory of Nottinghamshire of 1853, Gonalston... John Francklin Esq. owns the whole lordship, and is patron of the rectory, which is valued in the King's books at £7 19s 2d, now £324, and is enjoyed by the Rev. Edward Walker Foottit B.A. The church, dedicated to St Lawrence, is a small structure, with a tower and two bells, and was rebuilt in 1852. In Thoroton's time it contained some ancient figures of crusaders, but they were either destroyed or removed at the diminution of the church. They have since been taken up by the present proprietor, under the superintendence of Rd. West Macott Esq. R.A., and are about to be placed in the name of the new edifice."

Notable buildings
The parish church of St Laurence dates from the 14th century. It lies outside the village centre, in the grounds of the rectory, close to the manor house and home farm.

The village was famed in ancient times for its hospital or spital now lost, and its effigies of Crusaders. "William de Heris, in the reign of Henry III, founded an hospital here called the Spital, "to the honour of St. Mary Magdalene;" the successive rectors of the parish were masters, and formerly preached their induction sermon upon its ruins."

Archaeology
Some recent and important archaeological discoveries have been made in the East Midlands and especially in the silts of the Trent Valley area. This includes finds in Gonalston. At Holme Dyke, Gonalston, Neolithic pottery has been excavated from a ring ditch, and a Late Bronze Age domestic site (as a burnt mound) was uncovered by quarry workings.

Notes

External links

 1903 article concerning Gonalston church and Spital

Newark and Sherwood
Villages in Nottinghamshire